The New Tube for London (NTfL) is a type of London Underground train to be built by Siemens as part of its Inspiro family at Siemens's factories in Goole (East Yorkshire) and Vienna, Austria.

An initial batch of 94 nine-car trains has been ordered at a cost of £1.5billion to replace 1973 Stock trains on the Piccadilly line, with options for a total of 250 trains allowing replacement of all existing trains on the deep-level Central, Waterloo & City and Bakerloo lines. Planned starting date for the service is 2025, firstly on the Piccadilly line,  with a train driver, but equipped for driverless operation.

History

Background 
In the late 1990s, the Labour government initiated a public–private partnership (PPP) to reverse years of underinvestment in London Underground. Under the PPP contracts, two private consortiums (Metronet and Tube Lines) would maintain, renew and upgrade London Underground infrastructure over a period of 30 years from 2003. As part of the upgrade work, new rolling stock was to be ordered. 

Tube Lines planned to order 93 new Piccadilly line trains, which would enter service by 2014. In January 2007, Tube Lines started the process of ordering new Piccadilly line trains, by querying if train manufacturers would be interested in supplying them. Contract award was anticipated for 2008, with trains to enter service on the Piccadilly line in 2014. Following the delivery of 2009 Stock and S Stock trains in the 2010s, Metronet planned to order 24 new Bakerloo line trains, which would enter service by 2019.  

However, Metronet was placed in administration in 2007 after cost overruns, and Transport for London (TfL) bought out the Tube Lines consortium in 2010, formally ending the PPP.

Feasibility and initial planning 
Following the collapse of the PPPs, TfL began planning the modernisation of Underground lines not started by the PPP. This project would include the eventual replacement of trains, new signalling and other upgrades to the Piccadilly, Central, Waterloo & City and Bakerloo lines. This would complete the modernisation of Underground lines started with the formation of TfL in 2000.

In 2017 TfL said that existing trains on the Bakerloo and Piccadilly lines were approaching the end of their useful lives, and the 1992 Stock used on the Central and Waterloo & City lines was significantly less reliable than more modern rolling stock.

Replacement of these older trains with open gangway rolling stock – similar to the S Stock used on the Underground's subsurface lines – would increase passenger capacity, with new automatic signalling increasing capacity further. Although the use of open gangways was considered in the late 1990s, the Bombardier 2009 Stock did not have open gangways. New trains would also have air conditioning, which earlier deep-level trains lacked.  

In 2011, Siemens presented "EVO" – a conceptual articulated train with walk-through cars, that would be 30tonnes lighter, consume 17 per cent less energy and have 11 per cent more passenger capacity than existing trains. A mock-up of the Siemens Inspiro design was exhibited at The Crystal between October 2013 and January 2014. Siemens also proposed building the new train in the UK, after being criticised for building the Class 700 Thameslink trains in Germany.

Potential of driverless operation 
New trains would have the potential to operate automatically without a driver, which would save operating costs and prevent disruption during strikes. This unattended train operation would require the installation of platform screen doors, a substantial additional cost. The ASLEF and RMT trade unions that represent drivers strongly oppose the introduction of driverless trains, saying it would affect safety. 

In 2020, a leaked TfL study found that the upgrade work required for totally unattended train operation – including platform screen doors and a safety walkway in tunnels – would cost around £7billion, concluding that "the financial payback is negative". The study also indicated that automatically driven trains with a member of staff present on board (similar to the Docklands Light Railway) offered "reasonable value for money." However, the Department for Transport pushed for the introduction of driverless trains as a precondition of any future long term funding deal for TfL.

New Tube for London 

In early 2014, the project was named New Tube for London (NTfL) and moved from a feasibility stage to the design and specification stage. A TfL feasibility study showed that new generation trains and re-signalling could increase capacity:

Overall, the project is estimated to cost a total of £16billion, with a benefit/cost ratio of 4.2 to 1. The Piccadilly line would be the first to be upgraded, given the age of its rolling stock. Other lines would then be upgraded over a period of around 10 years.

Bidding process 
In early 2014, TfL invited train manufacturers to make expressions of interest in the Official Journal of the European Union. TfL also commissioned industrial designers PriestmanGoode to produce a conceptual design to be used by the train manufacturers. Unveiled in October 2014 to high acclaim, the design included several features not seen before on the deep level tube, including walk-through carriages and air conditioning. 

In late 2014, TfL published a shortlist of manufacturers who had expressed an interest in supplying new trains – Alstom, Siemens, Hitachi, CAF and Bombardier. The invitation to tender for the trains was issued in January 2016, with a plan to award the contract in 2016, with trains entering service in 2023. During the tender period, Bombardier and Hitachi formed a joint venture (JV), and CAF chose not to submit a bid. Three bids (Alstom, Siemens, Hitachi/Bombardier JV) were submitted in September 2016. All bidders proposed to build the trains in existing or new UK factories.

Contract award and future contract options 
Since TfL could not afford 250 new trains and upgraded signalling, it decided to buy only 94 trains, for the Piccadilly line, and relegate future train purchases to contract options. In 2019, TfL raised £1billion to buy the Piccadilly line trains by selling and leasing back Class 345 Crossrail trains.

In total, 250 trains could be ordered throughout the lifetime of the Deep Tube Upgrade Programme, comprising 100 trains for the Piccadilly line, 40 for the Bakerloo line, 100 for the Central line and 10 for the Waterloo & City line. Future trains would be adapted to meet the requirements of lines, with the potential of active steering of bogies, and different numbers of cars per trainset as required.

Siemens 'InspiroLondon' 
In June 2018, the Siemens Mobility Inspiro design was selected, with 94 trains ordered in a £1.5billion contract. In July 2018, the award was challenged, unsuccessfully, in the High Court by the Hitachi/Bombardier JV; Siemens was awarded the contract in November 2018. 

TfL said that the trains would be designed and built by Siemens Mobility at its planned £200m new factory in Goole, East Riding of Yorkshire, and later that 50 per cent of the trains would be built at an existing Siemens factory in Vienna, Austria, while the Goole factory was constructed. In July 2020, Prime Minister Boris Johnson visited the Goole site to mark the start of construction of the factory. Manufacturing of the trains in Austria was due to start in August 2021, with first deliveries to London from 2024.

Despite the lack of resignalling, the purchase of new trains will still increase the capacity of the Piccadilly line, with 27 trains per hour at peak times by 2027. Trains will enter service with a train operator. However, resignalling of the line could permit driverless operation in future.

Features of the new train include:

 10 per cent increase in passenger capacity per train due to the open gangway design
 Wider double doorways throughout, with no single-width doorways, allowing for faster boarding
 Energy consumption 20 per cent lower than existing trains due to regenerative brakes, LED lighting and lighter construction
 Air conditioning, for the first time on the deep-level tube 
 Faster and more reliable than existing older trains
 Ability to drive automatically once lines have been resignalled, with potential for driverless operation
 LED screens to provide passenger information and advertising

Siemens has branded the train "Inspiro London", although some sources have named it "2024 Stock", following the existing naming precedent. , the official name of the train had not been confirmed by TfL.

Initially, deliveries were to begin in 2023, with entry into service in 2024. , the delivery schedule had slipped: the trains were now expected to enter service on the Piccadilly line in 2025, followed by improvements to service levels in 2027.

References

External links

 Transport for London - Piccadilly line upgrade
 Specification sheet from Siemens Mobility
Piccadilly Line trains: a journey from 1891 to 2025 - detailed background on the design of the trains

London Underground electric multiple units
Siemens multiple units